Hansa Borg Bryggerier  is a Norwegian brewery and distribution company which markets beer, bottled water and soft drinks.

History
Hansa Borg Bryggerier AS was founded in 1997, after a merger between Hansa Bryggeri and Borg Bryggerier. The company is controlled by the Egenæss family (75% ownership), who owned Borg since 1905 until the merger in 1997. Other principal owners are the Swedish-based Spendrups Bryggeri AB and Danish-based Royal Unibrew.

The brewery is Norway's second largest manufacturing and marketing of beer and mineral water. It operates three regional breweries plants located in Bergen, Sarpsborg, Kristiansand and Olden, Norway.  Beer brands include Hansa, Waldemars, Borg and CB, as well as Heineken and Clausthaler  under license. In 1999, Hansa Borg acquired Christianssands Bryggeri (CB). This gave Hansa Borg nationwide distribution of all its three main brands of beer, as well as controlling the local markets in Hordaland, Østfold, and Southern Norway. In 2005, Hansa Borg acquired Olden Brevatn, a company that produces drinking water from a glacier in Oldedalen.

References

External links
Hansa Borg Bryggerier official website

Breweries in Norway
Companies established in 1997
Manufacturing companies based in Bergen
Royal Unibrew subsidiaries